2 is a number, numeral, and glyph.

2, two or II may also refer to:

 AD 2, the second year of the AD era
 2 BC, the second year before the AD era
 The month of February

Music

Bands 
 Two (metal band)

Albums 
 2 (All Girl Summer Fun Band album), 2003
 2 (Black Country Communion album), 2011
 2 (The Black Heart Procession album), 1999
 2 (Ned Collette album), 2012
 2 (Darker My Love album), 2008
 2 (Mac DeMarco album), 2012
 2 (Dover album), 2007
 2 (The Gloaming album), 2016
 2 (Erkin Koray album), 1976
 2 (Amaia Montero album), 2011
 2 (Mudcrutch album), 2016
 2 (Netsky album), 2012
 2 (Olivia Newton-John album), 2002
 2 (Nik & Jay album), 2004
 2 (Florent Pagny album), 2001
 2 (Pole album), 1999
 2 (Retribution Gospel Choir album), 2010
 2 (Rockapella album), 2000
 2 (Saint Lu album), 2013, by Luise Gruber
 2 (Smoking Popes EP), 1993
 2 (Sneaky Sound System album), 2008
 2 (Strings album), 1992
 2 (Thee Oh Sees album), 2004, released under the name, OCS
 II (Cursed album), 2005
 Two (The Calling album), 2004
 Two (Earshot album), 2004
 Two (GQ album), 1980
 Two (Bob James album), 1975
 Two (Lenka album), 2011
 Two (Miss Kittin & The Hacker album), 2009
 Two (Jemeel Moondoc album), 2012, with Connie Crothers
 Two (Soko album), 2005
 Two (Tebey album), 2014
 Two (Utah Saints album), 2000
 Two (Poverty), 2007, by Demiricous
 T.W.O (Aya Matsuura album) (ティー・ダブリュ・オー), 2003
 Tages 2, commonly referred to as just 2, 1966

EPs 
 Two (Charlotte Church EP), 2013
 2 (Smoking Popes EP), 1993
 #2 (Suburban Kids with Biblical Names EP), 2005

Songs 
 "Two", a song by singer Ryan Adams from his album Easy Tiger
 "Two", a song by singer Todrick Hall
 "Two", a song by musical duo Twenty One Pilots
 "Two", a song by band Simple Plan from their album Harder Than It Looks

Film and television

Films 
 Two (1964 film), an Indian film
 Two (1974 film), an American film
 Itchy & Scratchy Land Twoever After, a 1999 American film
 Two (2002 film), a French film
 Madagascar 2, a 2008 American film
 2 (film), an Indian film

Television 
 BBC Two, a British television station
 BBC Two 'Computer Generated 2' ident, used from 1979 to 1986
 BBC Two 'Two' ident, a television ident for BBC Two, used from 1986 to 1991
 RTP2, formerly "2:" or "a dois", a Portuguese television station
 TVNZ 2, formerly TV2, a New Zealand television station 
 Two (TV series), a Canadian drama series from 1996 to 1997
 "Two" (The Twilight Zone), a 1961 episode of The Twilight Zone
 "Two" (Dark Angel), an episode of the television series Dark Angel
 France 2, a channel that is part of France Television
 SVT 2, a Swedish television channel

Transportation
 2 (New York City Subway service), a service of the New York City Subway
 Mazda2, a hatchback car
 Tai Wo station, Hong Kong; MTR station code TWO
 Nikola Two, a proposed electric semi-truck tractor unit

Others
 2 Pallas, a large asteroid

 2 (algebra), the two-element Boolean algebra, for which Paul Halmos introduced the bolded "2" notation
 ②, the Stenhaus-Moser number also called mega (number)

See also 

 02 (disambiguation)
 2. (disambiguation)
 2+2 (disambiguation)
 Couple (disambiguation)
 Duo (disambiguation)
 II (disambiguation)
 Number Two (disambiguation)
 Second (disambiguation)
 Too (disambiguation)
 Tue (disambiguation)
 Two by Two (disambiguation)
 Two two (disambiguation)
 Year Two, an educational year group in schools